Hajjiabad-e Bala (also Romanized as Ḩājjīābād-e Bālā) is a village in Aliabad Rural District, in the Central District of Taft County, Yazd Province, Iran. At the 2006 census, its population was 14, in 5 families.

References 

Populated places in Taft County